Jung Ji-hae (born 6 March 1985) is a South Korean handball player. She plays for the South Korean national team and participated at the 2011 World Women's Handball Championship in Brazil and the 2012 Summer Olympics.

References

1985 births
Living people
Handball players from Seoul
South Korean female handball players
Handball players at the 2012 Summer Olympics
Olympic handball players of South Korea
Handball players at the 2010 Asian Games
Handball players at the 2014 Asian Games
Handball players at the 2018 Asian Games
Asian Games gold medalists for South Korea
Asian Games bronze medalists for South Korea
Asian Games medalists in handball
Medalists at the 2010 Asian Games
Medalists at the 2014 Asian Games
Medalists at the 2018 Asian Games